The 2009–10 Mercyhurst Lakers women's ice hockey team represented Mercyhurst College in the 2009–10 NCAA Division I women's ice hockey season. The Lakers were coached by Michael Sisti. Assisting Sisti are Paul Colontino and Louis Goulet. Mike Folga was the Head Equipment Manager. The Lakers will attempt to qualify for the NCAA Women's Frozen Four for the second consecutive season. Vicki Bendus, Bailey Bram and Jesse Scanzano were all Top-10 finalists for the Patty Kazmaier Award. This marked only the third time in NCAA history (Harvard: 1999, Wisconsin: 2009) that one school had three nominees in the Top 10. Bendus was honoured with the award.

Offseason
July 31: Mercyhurst College women’s hockey alumna Valerie Chouinard has been selected as the College Hockey America nominee for the NCAA Woman of the Year. The NCAA Woman of the Year Award honors senior women student-athletes who have excelled in the areas of academic achievement, athletics, service and leadership.
August 11: Sophomore Bailey Bram helped Team Canada White defeat Sweden by a score of 4-0. The 2009 College Hockey America Rookie of the Year scored 1:43 into the third period to extend Team White’s advantage to 2-0. It was her first goal as a member of the Canadian Under-22 program.
August 17: Three current players and an alumna of the Mercyhurst College women’s hockey team have been selected to the 2009-10 Canadian National Women’s Under-22 Team. Juniors Vicki Bendus and Jesse Scanzano, sophomore Bailey Bram and 2008 graduate Laura Mosier will make up part of the 23-player roster that is set to compete against the Canadian National Team.
August 21: The Canadian National Team closed out its three-game series against the under-22 squad with a 10-0 victory. Mercyhurst star Meghan Agosta recorded two goals and an assist, joining Hayley Wickenheiser, Marie-Philip Poulin and Rebecca Johnston as National Team members with at least two goals in the game.
September 17: The Mercyhurst College women’ hockey team has been predicted to finish first in the College Hockey America Preseason Coaches’ Poll, released by CHA league officials. Mercyhurst claimed four of five possible first-place votes (Wayne State had one) and 16 points to earn the top ranking for the eighth-straight season. In addition to the poll, five Lakers were named to the Preseason All-CHA Team. Junior Jesse Scanzano, was also tabbed as Preseason CHA Player of the Year. Junior Vicki Bendus and third-year forward Scanzano earned two of the forward honors outright, while sophomore Bailey Bram tied for the third and final slot. Junior Ashley Cockell joined classmate Melissa Lacroix on defense. Sophomore Hillary Pattenden completed the team in a tie for best goaltender.

Exhibition

Regular season
October 5: The Lakers have been ranked as the national No. 1 team, USCHO.com officials revealed in their first Top-10 Women’s Hockey Poll of the season. The Lakers accumulated 140 points and eight first-place votes to earn top billing in the national poll.
October 17:  Vicki Bendus scored a season-high four points in the first period. Sophomore Hillary Pattenden made a season-high 32 saves in the game.
October 31: No. 1 ranked Mercyhurst College suffered its first loss of the season. Fifth-ranked Minnesota Duluth skated away to a 4-3 win and a split of the two-game series at the Mercyhurst Ice Center. With the loss, the Lakers fall to 7-1 on the season. 
December 6: The Robert Morris vs. Mercyhurst game on Sunday, December 6 at 1:00 p.m. has been postponed due to a water main break at the Mercyhurst Ice Center. The game is rescheduled for Tuesday, February 2 at 7:00 p.m.  
December 12: Jesse Scanzano scored three goals in the third period to lead Mercyhurst College women’s hockey team over No. 10 St. Lawrence, 6-2. One of those goals was the 50th goal of her career.
December 22: Mercyhurst College forward Meghan Agosta was one of 21 players nominated to represent Canada’s Women’s National Team at the 2010 Olympic Winter Games in Vancouver, B.C.
January 4: Juniors Vicki Bendus and Jesse Scanzano, and sophomore Bailey Bram will play for the Canadian National Under-22 Team at the 2010 MLP Cup, Jan. 5 – 9, in Ravensburg, Germany.
January 10:Junior Vicki Bendus scored a goal and added two assists for the Canadian National Women’s Under-22 Team in the gold medal game of the 2010 MLP Cup. Canada defeated Switzerland, 9-0 in Ravensburg, Germany. The Canadian team won all four of their games by a combined score of 24-4, and secured their seventh goal medal in the past eight years. Junior Jesse Scanzano and sophomore Bailey Bram each added a goal and an assist. In three games, the Mercyhurst trio combined for seven goals and 18 points. Bendus and Bram tied for the tournament lead with seven points each. Bendus was named the tournament's top forward.
January 23–24: Hillary Pattenden earned both victories in the Lakers' two victories against Syracuse.  She allowed just a power-play goal on Friday, while turning aside 20 Orange shots.  With the score knotted at one on Saturday, Pattenden did not allow a goal for nearly 40 minutes as Mercyhurst built up a 4-1 advantage.  The Lakers limited SU, the second-best power play in the league, to just two goals in 15 opportunities.
January 27: The Lakers have headed the USA TODAY/USA Hockey Magazine poll for fourteen consecutive weeks and are the unanimous choice with all 19 first-place votes for the eighth time.
January 30: Niagara became only the second team all year, and the first in the CHA team to defeat Mercyhurst. The Purple Eagles defeated the Lakers 2-1. Jenni Bauer stopped 44 of 45 shots, including all 19 fired her way in the second period in what was a scoreless game until the 42nd minute. The victory was the first-ever for the Purple Eagles over a top-ranked team and their first over the Lakers since 2004. The result snapped Mercyhurst's nation-leading 16-game unbeaten streak and 26-game CHA unbeaten run.
February 17: Vicki Bendus, Bailey Bram and Jesse Scanzano among 45 nominees for the Patty Kazmaier Memorial Award.
March 4: Vicki Bendus was named College Hockey America Player of the Year. She was given the honour at the 2010 CHA Tournament Banquet, at Ford Field in Detroit. Bendus, was also named a First Team All-CHA honoree. Other Lakers to be named as First Team All-CHA selections included Jesse Scanzano, Melissa Lacroix, Cassea Schols, and Bailey Bram. Samantha Watt landed a spot on the All-CHA Rookie Team.

Standings

Roster

Schedule
The Lakers will compete in the Easton Holiday Showcase to be held on January 2 and 3. Overall, the club will play 32 games against teams representing three different conferences this season. 10 games come against teams from the Eastern College Athletic Conference (ECAC), while six others represent contests against foes from the Western Collegiate Hockey Association (WCHA). The remaining 16 games are set aside for College Hockey America (CHA) teams.

Player stats

Skaters

Goaltenders

19 seconds was open net time

Team leaders
Game Winning Goals: Bailey Bram, 4 goals
Power Play points: Cassea Schols, 7 points
Power Play goals: Bailey Bram, 3 goals
Short handed goals: Vicki Bendus, 2 goals
Shots on Net, Vicki Bendus, 53 shots
Shot Percentage, .238 (5 goals on 21 shots)

Postseason

NCAA Hockey tournament
March 13: Bailey Bram scored two goals, including the game winner as the Lakers beat Boston University by a score of 4-1 in the NCAA Regionals.  
March 13: Vicki Bendus scored the 50th career goal of her career in the win over the Terriers. She is now the 8th Laker to have at least 50 goals in a career.

See also
2009–10 College Hockey America women's ice hockey season

Awards and honors
Vicki Bendus, CHA Player of the Week (October 6)
Vicki Bendus, CHA Player of the Week (November 30)
Vicki Bendus, CHA Player of the Week (January 4)
Vicki Bendus, CHA Player of the Week (January 18)
Vicki Bendus, CHA Player of the Year
Vicki Bendus, NCAA Elite 88 Award (awarded to student-athlete with the highest grade point average participating at an NCAA Championship event)
Vicki Bendus, 2010 Patty Kazmaier Award
Bailey Bram, CHA Player of the Week (October 26)
Bailey Bram, CHA Player of the Week (December 7)
Bailey Bram, CHA Offensive Player of the Week (Week of February 8)
Bailey Bram, CHA All-Tournament Team
Ashley Cockell, Most Valuable Player, CHA Tournament
Jess Jones, CHA Player of the Week (Week of March 1)
Lauren Jones, CHA Rookie of the Week (December 14)
Lauren Jones, CHA Rookie of the Week (January 4)
Melissa Lacroix selected Defensive Player of the Week  (Week of February 8)
Melissa Lacroix, CHA All-Tournament Team
Hillary Pattenden, CHA Defensive Player of the Week (October 19)
Hillary Pattenden, CHA Defensive Player of the Week (January 4)
Hillary Pattenden, CHA Defensive Player of the Week (January 25)
Hillary Pattenden, CHA Defensive Player of the Week (February 23)
Jesse Scanzano, CHA Player of the Week (November 9)
Jesse Scanzano, CHA All-Tournament Team
Hillary Steadman, CHA Player of the Week, (Week of November 23)
Kelley Steadman, CHA Player of the Week (Week of February 23)
Samantha Watt, CHA All-Rookie Team

Pre-Season All-CHA Team
F - Vicki Bendus 
F - Jesse Scanzano 
F - Bailey Bram, (tie)  
D - Ashley Cockell 
D - Melissa Lacroix, (tie)  
G - Hillary Pattenden, (tie) 
Player of the Year - Jesse Scanzano

All-CHA First Team
F - Vicki Bendus 
F - Jesse Scanzano 
F - Bailey Bram
 D- Melissa Lacroix, First Team All-CHA
 D- Cassea Schols, First Team All-CHA

All-America selections
 Vicki Bendus, 2010 Women's RBK Hockey Division I All-America First Team
 Jesse Scanzano, 2010 Women's RBK Hockey Division I All-America Second Team

Postseason
April 25: The Mercyhurst College women’s hockey team were honored by the Erie Storm, prior to their game against the Reading Express at Louis J. Tullio Arena.
June 10: Vicki Bendus was named a First Team CoSIDA / ESPN The Magazine Academic All-American

References

External links
Official Site

Mercyhurst
Mercyhurst Lakers women's ice hockey seasons
NCAA women's ice hockey Frozen Four seasons
Mercy
Mercy